Dawel Leoner Lugo Baez (born December 31, 1994) is a Dominican professional baseball infielder for the Mariachis de Guadalajara of the Mexican League. He has played in Major League Baseball (MLB) for the Detroit Tigers.

Career

Toronto Blue Jays
Lugo signed with the Toronto Blue Jays as a 16-year-old international free agent in 2011 for $1.3 million, the largest bonus paid to a Latin American infielder that year. Ben Badler of Baseball America described Lugo in a scouting report as having "a solid swing, good bat speed and makes consistent contact with natural loft, showing the potential for plus power down the road." He played his first season as a member of the Gulf Coast League Blue Jays in 2012, where he batted .224 in 47 games played. Lugo began the 2013 season playing with the Bluefield Blue Jays, where he posted a .297 batting average with 6 home runs and 36 RBIs in 51 games. He was then promoted to the Vancouver Canadians, and played 16 games in which he batted .246 with one home run and 8 RBIs. Lugo was promoted to the  Lansing Lugnuts for the 2014 season. He played in a career-high 117 games, where he batted .259 with 4 home runs and 53 RBI. He began 2015 with the Dunedin Blue Jays and was promoted to Lansing in July.

Arizona Diamondbacks
On August 8, 2015, Lugo was traded to the Arizona Diamondbacks for Cliff Pennington. Arizona assigned him to the Kane County Cougars. In 120 total games between Dunedin, Lansing and Kane County, he batted .270 with four home runs and 47 RBIs. In 2016, he played for both the Visalia Rawhide and the Mobile BayBears, compiling a combined .311 batting average with 17 home runs and 62 RBIs in 127 total games between both clubs. The Diamondbacks added him to their 40-man roster after the 2016 season. Lugo began 2017 with the Jackson Generals.

Detroit Tigers
On July 18, 2017, the Diamondbacks traded Lugo, Sergio Alcántara, and Jose King to the Detroit Tigers for J. D. Martinez. The Tigers assigned him to the Erie SeaWolves, where he finished the season. In 131 games between Jackson and Erie, he slashed .277/.321/.424 with 13 home runs and 65 RBIs.

On May 14, 2018, the Tigers called up Lugo after placing 3B Jeimer Candelario on the 10-day disabled list. The Tigers sent Lugo back down to Toledo the next day before he could make his major league debut. He was called up again on August 30, and made his debut that evening against the New York Yankees. Lugo got his first major league hit in his third at-bat, a double off Chad Green. He hit his first major league home run on September 28 off Josh Hader of the Milwaukee Brewers.

Lugo was assigned to the Triple A Toledo Mud Hens to start the 2019 season. He was recalled on May 16, and hit a three-run homer that afternoon. With the Tigers in 2019, Lugo hit .245 with 6 home runs and 26 RBI in 273 at-bats.

In 2020, Lugo made only 11 plate appearances for the Tigers, hitting a meager .200/.273/.200. On August 17, 2020, Lugo was designated for assignment and was outrighted on August 22. He became a free agent on November 2, 2020.

Mariachis de Guadalajara
On February 15, 2021, Lugo signed with the Mariachis de Guadalajara of the Mexican League.

References

External links

1994 births
Living people
Bluefield Blue Jays players
Detroit Tigers players
Dominican Republic expatriate baseball players in Canada
Dominican Republic expatriate baseball players in Mexico
Dominican Republic expatriate baseball players in the United States
Dunedin Blue Jays players
Erie SeaWolves players
Gulf Coast Blue Jays players
Jackson Generals (Southern League) players
Kane County Cougars players
Lansing Lugnuts players
Major League Baseball players from the Dominican Republic
Major League Baseball second basemen
Major League Baseball third basemen
Mariachis de Guadalajara players
Mobile BayBears players
People from Baní
Salt River Rafters players
Tigres del Licey players
Toledo Mud Hens players
Vancouver Canadians players
Visalia Rawhide players